Thomas Timothy Flood  (March 13, 1877 – June 15, 1929), was a professional baseball player who played second base for the St. Louis Perfectos in 1899  and the Brooklyn Superbas from 1902 to 1903.

While playing minor league baseball in Canada in 1907, Flood was arrested for assaulting an umpire during a game and served one week in jail. He was subsequently suspended from the league.

Notes

External links

 Baseball Almanac

1877 births
1929 deaths
Major League Baseball second basemen
Brooklyn Superbas players
St. Louis Perfectos players
Baseball players from Missouri
New Orleans Pelicans (baseball) players
Chattanooga Warriors players
Mobile Bluebirds players
Cedar Rapids Rabbits players
Fort Wayne Indians players
Ottumwa Giants players
Buffalo Bisons (minor league) players
Cleveland Lake Shores players
Sacramento Senators players
St. Paul Saints (AA) managers
St. Joseph Saints players
Los Angeles Angels (minor league) managers
Los Angeles Angels (minor league) players
Altoona Mountaineers players
St. Paul Saints (AA) players
Toronto Maple Leafs (International League) players
Little Rock Travelers players
Nashville Vols players
Cairo Egyptians players
Winnipeg Maroons (baseball) players
19th-century baseball players
People from Montgomery City, Missouri
American people convicted of assault
Burials at Calvary Cemetery (St. Louis)